Our Own Masters is the sixth studio album by American heavy metal band Valient Thorr. It was released in June 2013 under Volcom Entertainment.

Track list

References

2013 albums
Valient Thorr albums
Volcom Entertainment albums